Susan Gundunas is an American Soprano vocalist specializing in operatic performances.

A graduate of Santa Clara University, Gundunas has performed in Hamburg, Germany's production of Andrew Lloyd Webber's Phantom of the Opera. She has also performed operatic arias on national German radio and television. In November 2009, she released her critically acclaimed CD, All the World's A Stage.
In addition to her operatic performances she also runs a vocal studio in San Francisco and teaches voice at the University of California, Berkeley.

References 

American operatic sopranos
Living people
Place of birth missing (living people)
Santa Clara University alumni
Year of birth missing (living people)
21st-century American women